Angelos Eleftheriadis (born 15 April 1991) is a Greek footballer who plays as a central defender for Hebburn Town.

References

External links

1991 births
Living people
Footballers from Thessaloniki
Greek footballers
Association football defenders
Kavala F.C. players
Rot-Weiß Oberhausen players
SV Wilhelmshaven players
VfR Neumünster players
Omonia Aradippou players
Greek expatriate footballers
Greek expatriate sportspeople in Germany
Expatriate footballers in Germany